GV Films is an Indian film production and distribution company headed by Ishari K. Ganesh. The firm had been a leading production studio in the Tamil film industry in the 1990s and had been founded by G. Venkateswaran as Sujatha Films in 1986.

History

Film industry
Sujatha Films was set up in 1986 by G. Venkateswaran, a chartered accountant, as a film production and distribution company. Operating as a family production house, Venkateswaran's brother Mani Ratnam also often assisted on the production work of films that he directed for the studio. Sujatha Films became GV Films as it became the first publicly listed company from the Indian media industry in 1989.

The early films by the studio saw frequent collaborations with Mani Ratnam and Visu, as well as with composer A. R. Rahman. Films including Anjali and Thalapathi were among the studio's most notable films.

GV Films produced Suhasini Maniratnam's first film Indira (1995) featuring Anu Hasan and Arvind Swamy in the lead roles. The film did not perform well at the box office, prompting GV Films to stop production and prioritise distribution ventures. However, some distribution ventures including Aalavandhan (2001) and Baba (2002) were also expensive failures.

GV Films made a return to production in the early 2000s, first working on the making of Thamizhan (2002) directed by debutant Majith. The film featured Vijay and Priyanka Chopra in her first acting role. Further films that the studio worked on included Vasanth's Yai! Nee Romba Azhaga Irukke! (2002) and K. Bhagyaraj's Chokka Thangam (2003) with Vijayakanth. All three films did not perform well commercially. Subsequently, Venkateswaran came under pressure from film financiers. In April 2003, Venkateswaran committed suicide at his residence in Chennai.

Following Venkateswaran's death, the studio continued to produce media content under the same name. Notably, actress Manisha Koirala was briefly a board member as the studio attempted to make a comeback through Hindi film content and 3D television serials. The studio launched a big budget Hindi film directed by Mahesh Manjrekar starring Sanjay Dutt in late 2005, though it was later stalled. Kasthuri Shankar also worked with the studio and assisted on the oversight of the production of Urchagam (2007). The studio returned to prioritising distribution ventures and instead chose to make small budget films such as Kaivantha Kalai (2006) and Thirudi (2006). In 2015, GV Films held a ceremony in Mumbai to mark 25 years since its founding.

Other ventures
In 1993, GV Films worked on bringing Michael Jackson to India for two live concerts to be held in Bombay and Madras on 8 and 10 December in aid of the Rajiv Gandhi Foundation. The event was later cancelled prompting the studio to suffer heavy losses and begin litigation.

In 2000, GV Films paid $43.6 million to acquire about 8,000 international titles from a seller's offshore investment company Pinewood Films. This included the masters for non-exclusive internet, DVD and theatrical rights. The deal was considered the biggest catalogue buyout by an Indian company. During the same period, GV Films entered into a joint venture with UK internet portal Asian Online.

As of 2020, the group of companies is headed by Ishari K. Ganesh.

Filmography

Film production
as Sujatha Films

as GV Films

Film distribution
In addition to the production of films since 2010, GV Films has also been involved in distributing films of other production houses across certain regions.
Aalavandhan (2001)
Baba (2002)
Vettaiyaadu Vilaiyaadu (2006)
Vallavan (2006)
Thaamirabharani (2007)
Sivaji (2007)

Television
Mayavi (Jaya TV)

References 

Film distributors of India
Film production companies based in Chennai
Indian film studios
1989 establishments in Tamil Nadu
Indian companies established in 1989
Mass media companies established in 1989